The GOC Army Headquarters (Mifkedet Zro'a HaYabasha, abbreviated Mazi), is a multi-corps command headquarters created in 1998, which amalgamates the ground forces of the Israel Defense Forces. The current size of the Israeli Ground Forces is estimated at 126,000 active soldiers and 400,000 soldiers in reserve.

Name 

The GOC Army Headquarters is known unofficially as Mazi, the Hebrew pronunciation for an acronym for "Ground Arm Command" ((Mifkedet Zro'a ha-Yabasha), which was the GOC Army Headquarters' previous name before being renamed to the current "Ground Arm". After this renaming, the acronym MAZI officially refers nowadays to "Commander of the Ground Arm" (Mefaked Zro'a Ha-Yabasha). However the old acronym MAZI still remains the popular name for the GOC Army Headquarters.

Units and structure

The Headquarters of the Ground Forces commands the following five corps:

 Maneuvering Corps (Established in 2020) :
 Infantry Corps
 Armor Corps
 Combat Engineering Corps
99th "HaBazaq" Paratroopers Division (He) 
 Combat support corps:
 Artillery Corps
 Combat Intelligence Corps

In addition, the Headquarters includes four "staff divisions":

 Planning Division (Budget and Organization Planning)
 "Ground" Division (Training and Doctrine)
 Personnel Division
 Technological Division (Materiel R&D and Acquisition)

The IDF's third arm

Under the IDF 2000 reforms, MAZI was set to become the IDF's third Arm, alongside the Air and Space Force and the Navy. Until the creation of MAZI, IDF ground forces were directly subordinated to the Chief of Staff through the Regional Commands (North, South, and Central). The intention of the reform was to subordinate the ground forces to one ground commander, who is a part of the Joint Staff, by the example of the Israeli Air and Space Force and Navy; and unlike most of the other armed forces, where operational Army, Air Force, and Navy plus other auxiliary support units, are all subordinated to unified commands.

The proposed reform for the Ground Arm was rejected and the ground forces remain subordinated to the three regional commands. Likewise with combat support and rear-line corps, which are partly subordinated to the respective Directorates. In times of war, the Ground Arm Commander acts as an advisor to the IDF Chief of Staff on ground warfare.

As an IDF arm, the Ground Arm is meant to build of the ground forces' strength and working toward balance, combination, and coordination between the ground corps. It does so by instruction and training of individual units, planning and publishing the relevant doctrine, organizing the forces respectively for their missions, and R&D and acquisition of materiel. Its authority ranges up to the corps level. Above it, meaning the regional commands themselves, the authority is of the IDF Joint Staff.

Commanders

See also
 Israeli Ground Forces equipment

References

External links
 Ground Arm website 
 Army Headquarters' LIC2005: an international conference on "Warfare in Low Intensity Conflict"

1998 establishments in Israel
Israel Defense Forces
Israel
Military units and formations established in 1998